The 2013 IRB Tbilisi Cup was the inaugural edition of this international rugby union tournament, created by the International Rugby Board and was played from 7 to 16 June 2013 at the Avchala Stadium in Tbilisi.

The hosts Georgia were joined by Uruguay, who regularly take part in the IRB Nations Cup, and two newly founded teams: Emerging Ireland, who were made up of young Irish players that didn't get selected for the Lions tour to Australia or the national side's tour to North America, and a South Africa President's XV, composed of Currie Cup players.

South Africa President's XV won the inaugural tournament after winning all three of their games.

Following this tournament, Georgia played Argentina for the first time outside the Rugby World Cup on 22 June as part of the 2013 mid-year tests.

Table

Fixtures
All times are local

Matchday 1

Matchday 2

Matchday 3

Statistics

Leading point scorers

Leading try scorers

See also
 2013 IRB Nations Cup
 2013 IRB Pacific Nations Cup

References

External links

World Rugby Tbilisi Cup
2013 rugby union tournaments for national teams
2013 in Georgian sport
2013 in Uruguayan sport
2013 in South African rugby union
2012–13 in Irish rugby union